The men's decathlon was a track and field athletics event held as part of the Athletics at the 1920 Summer Olympics programme.

Results

References

Sources
 
 

Men's all-around decathlon
1920